Omer Abdelqader (born October 1, 1983 in Doha, Qatar) is a professional basketball player. He plays for Qatar SC of the Qatar basketball league.  He is also a member of the Qatar national basketball team.

Abdelqader competed for the Qatar national basketball team at the 2007 and FIBA Asia Championship 2009.  He also competed for Qatar at their only FIBA World Championship performance to date, in 2006, where he averaged 5.4 points and 5.8 rebounds per game.

References

1983 births
Living people
Qatari men's basketball players
Asian Games medalists in basketball
Basketball players at the 2006 Asian Games
Basketball players at the 2014 Asian Games
Centers (basketball)
Asian Games silver medalists for Qatar
Medalists at the 2006 Asian Games